Mayrig (Mother) is a 1991 semi-autobiographical film written and directed by French-Armenian filmmaker Henri Verneuil. The film's principal cast includes Claudia Cardinale and Omar Sharif as parents of Azad (Henri Verneuil depicted as child). Mayrig means mother in Armenian. The film is about the struggles of an Armenian family that emigrates to France from Turkey after the Armenian genocide of 1915.

For the film's main soundtrack, Verneuil used the traditional Armenian song "Dle Yaman".

Following the film's success, Verneuil edited the movie into a television series. He followed that up with 588 rue paradis, a sequel to the original movie.

Synopsis
The film opens with the court process of Soghomon Tehlirian who was being tried in Berlin for his 1921 Assassination of Talat Pasha, one of the plotters of the Armenian genocide. This introduces the viewer to the arrival of the Armenian Zakarian family fleeing persecution in the Ottoman Empire to refuge in Marseilles, France.

The film recounts the biography of Azad Zakarian and his parents and aunts, taking us in a 20 year journey of the family facing tough times as refugees. This is based on the memories of Azad (actually Henri Verneuil himself) starting from a six-year-old kid with many flashbacks to the period of genocide in Turkey.

Azad also tells us about difficulties of integrating in French society with hostile attitudes of the French towards the refugees (neighbour who refuse to give access to the common kitchen prohibiting the family of cooking its food, the owner of the lodging blaming them for bringing bedbugs to the facility, heavy bullying of Azad in school, mocking of the Catholic priest of Azad's Armenian Christian beliefs, difficulty of finding work for the family members, language issues, etc.

Cast
 Claudia Cardinale : Araxi (Mayrig), Azad's mother
 Omar Sharif : Hagop, Azad's father
 Cédric Doucet  : Azad Zakarian (7 years old)
 Tom Poncin : Azad Zakarian (12 years old)
 Stéphane Servais : Azad Zakarian (20 years old)
 Richard Berry : Azad Zakarian's voice (narrator)
 Nathalie Roussel : Gayane, Azad's aunt
 Isabelle Sadoyan : Anna, Azad's aunt
 Jacky Nercessian : Apkar, family friend
 Serge Avedikian : Vasken Papazian
 Michèle Bardollet : Madeleine
 Christian Barbier : Father Pignon
 Denis Podalydès : Soghomon Tehlirian
 Patrick Timsit : Garbis
 Ticky Holgado: Racist neighbour
 Jean-Pierre Delage : Dr. Philibert
 Nicolas Silberg : Lawyer
 Ève Ruggieri : Herself

Reception
The film has a 95% rating at Rotten Tomatoes.

Awards and nominations
Mayrig received a César Award nomination for Jean-Claude Petit's original score.
Mayrig also won an Academy Award by the National Academy of Cinema, France, in 1991.

In popular culture
Certain scenes of the film were used in the music video for "Chez nous (Plan d'Aou, Air Bel)" by French singer of Armenian descent Patrick Fiori with French singer of Comorian descent Soprano.

References

Biography of director Henri Verneuil

External links

1991 films
1991 drama films
1990s French-language films
French drama films
Films about playwrights
Films about immigration
Armenian genocide films
Films directed by Henri Verneuil
1990s French films